John McCain (1936–2018) was a United States Senator and the 2008 Republican presidential candidate.

John McCain may also refer to:

People

Senator's family
 John McCain (1851–1934), farmer, father of John S. McCain Sr., and great-grandfather of the senator; See Early life and military career of John McCain
 John S. McCain Sr. (1884–1945), US Navy four-star admiral, father of John S. McCain Jr., and grandfather of the senator
 John S. McCain Jr. (1911–1981), US Navy four-star admiral, son of John S. McCain Sr., and father of the senator

Other persons
 Jonathan McKain (born 1982), Australian association football player
 John W. McCain, CEO of Keane

Ships
 USS John S. McCain (DL-3), a Mitscher-class guided-missile destroyer-leader, later re-designated as the destroyer DDG-36, commissioned in 1953 and decommissioned in 1978
 USS John S. McCain (DDG-56), an Arleigh-Burke-class guided-missile destroyer commissioned in 1994

See also
 John McClane, fictional hero of the Die Hard action film series, played by Bruce Willis
 John S. McCain (disambiguation)
 USS John McCain, a list of ships of the US Navy
 John Cain (disambiguation)